Pisqan Punta (Quechua pichqa, pisqa five, -n a suffix, punta peak; ridge, hispanicized spelling Pisccanpunta, Pisjanpunta) is a mountain in the southernmost part of the Wallanka mountain range in the Andes of Peru which reaches an altitude of approximately . It is located in the Ancash Region, Bolognesi Province, Huasta District. Pisqan Punta lies at the Quntayqucha valley, southwest of a lake named Quntayqucha.

References 

Mountains of Peru
Mountains of Ancash Region